Norman Callender (9 June 1924 – 1990) was an English footballer who made 27 appearances in the Football League playing as a wing half for Darlington in the 1940s.

Callender joined Darlington while stationed in the area during the war, and was still a serving soldier when he began playing for the club: he had to drop out of the team in February 1947 after he was posted to the Middle East. After leaving Darlington, he signed for Horden Colliery Welfare, for whom he played until at least the 1951–52 season.

He later became a civil servant with the Ministry of Defence and moved into refereeing in 1955. While based in Richmond in North Yorkshire he became a Football League linesman in 1962 and was promoted to the Referees List in 1965 where he remained until 1968. He is one of very few former professional players to have achieved this distinction.

Notes

References

1924 births
1990 deaths
People from Newburn
Footballers from Tyne and Wear
English footballers
Association football wing halves
Darlington F.C. players
Darlington Town F.C. players
English Football League players